Handscomb is a surname. Notable people with the surname include:

 Peter Handscomb (born 1991), Australian cricketer
 Sue Handscomb (born 1956), British rower